Nataša Kolega (born 6 June 1966) is a former Yugoslav and Croatian handball player. She competed in the women's tournament at the 1988 Summer Olympics, where the Yugoslav team finished fourth.

References

External links
 

1966 births
Living people
Croatian female handball players
Olympic handball players of Yugoslavia
Handball players at the 1988 Summer Olympics
Place of birth missing (living people)
Sportspeople from Podgorica